Walter Cuthbert Creasor (31 October 1902 – 18 November 1975) was an English footballer and speedway rider.

He played as an outside left in the Football League for Darlington, and was on the books of Middlesbrough without representing them in the league. After finishing his football career, he took up speedway. He rode alongside his brother Fred for the Newcastle team in the 1929 English Dirt Track League.

Life and career
Creasor was born in Middlesbrough, Yorkshire, the third child of John Thomas Creasor, a master butcher, and his wife Louisa. He began his football career at Northern League side Redcar, then joined the books of his hometown club, Middlesbrough F.C. the following season, and played for the reserve team in the North-Eastern League, but not for the Football League team. He signed for Third Division North club Darlington ahead of the 1923–24 season. Again, he played mostly for the club's reserve team, in benefit matches and in local cups, but he did make six league appearances, scoring once.

He went on to take up motorcycle sports. Representing the Middlesbrough & District Motor Club, he and his older brother, Fred, reached the final of a six-a-side motorcycle football cup competition, organised under the auspices of the Auto-Cycle Union; Middlesbrough lost to Coventry Ace M.C. at Headingley, Leeds, in March 1927 after the first final, at Crystal Palace, London, was abandoned because of rain.

Creasor rode in the first speedway meeting in the north-east of England, at the Cleveland Park track, Middlesbrough, in August 1928. He rode in the 1929 Scottish Open, being eliminated in his heat by eventual winner Drew McQueen. He competed for Newcastle in the 1929 English Dirt Track League, and topped his team's averages. After Newcastle lost to Halifax in the semi-final of the English Dirt Track Knockout Cup, the winners borrowed Creasor for the final, a heavy defeat to Preston. In September 1929, he rode for Yorkshire against Lancashire at Wembley.

Creasor was a resident of Linthorpe, Middlesbrough, at the time of his death in November 1975 at the age of 73.

Notes

References

External links
 Newspaper cuttings and photographs at newcastlespeedwayhistory.co.uk

1902 births
1975 deaths
Footballers from Middlesbrough
English footballers
Association football wingers
Middlesbrough F.C. players
Darlington F.C. players
English Football League players
British speedway riders
Newcastle Diamonds riders